WEKU (88.9 FM) is a Peabody award-winning National Public Radio-charter member station licensed to Richmond, Kentucky serving central and eastern Kentucky, including nearby Lexington. Owned by Eastern Kentucky University, WEKU primarily broadcasts NPR news and talk programming along with locally produced content including Eastern Standard as well as local news and arts and cultural stories.

WEKU broadcasts live separate news and classical streams online at weku.org and on the WEKU mobile app.

Translators
WEKU operates four full-power satellite stations, along with five low-power translator stations. Their combined footprint covers nearly half of the Commonwealth.

References

External links
 WEKU official website
 
 
 
 
 
 
 
 
 
 
 
 
 
 

NPR member stations
EKU
Peabody Award winners
Eastern Kentucky University
College radio stations in Kentucky
1968 establishments in Kentucky
Radio stations established in 1968